Dreamworld Africana  is an amusement and theme park situated in Lekki, Lagos State.
 
Established in 2018, Dreamworld covers an area of 10 acres (4 ha) and re-opened to the public in 2013. The park is one of the main amusement parks in the city. The park provides many attractions to keep its visitors excited. The attractions include wet and dry facilities, bumper cars, carousal, roller coaster, trains, merry go-rounds, toddler play areas and many others.

The park was initiated by private sector investors in the 2010s based on economic development funding from Lagos State Government. There are plans to expand the parks entertainment facilities and attractions.

References

External links

Amusement parks in Lagos
2018 establishments in Nigeria
Tourist attractions in Lagos